Talijan Kar (also Romanized as Talījān Kar) is a village in Pir Kuh Rural District, Deylaman District, Siahkal County, Gilan Province, Iran. At the 2006 census, its population was 41, in 9 families.

References 

Populated places in Siahkal County